Jack Brooks Regional Airport , formerly Southeast Texas Regional Airport, is near Port Arthur, Texas, nine miles (14 km) southeast of Beaumont and northeast of Port Arthur. It was Jefferson County Airport, but its name was changed to honor former U.S. Representative Jack Brooks (D - Beaumont). The airport is southwest of the city of Nederland in unincorporated Jefferson County, and is used for general aviation.  Southwest Airlines ended scheduled jet service in 1980 and several other airlines have started and ended service as well including American Eagle, Continental, Delta/Delta Connection and United Express. The latest chapter is the resumption of service by American Eagle for American Airlines to Dallas/Ft. Worth (DFW).

Facilities

In the year ending January 31, 2007, the Jack Brooks Regional airport had 59,010 aircraft operations, average 161 per day: 82% general aviation, 11% air taxi, 7% military and less than 1% airline. In August 2017, 89 aircraft were based at this airport: 60 single-engine, 8 multi-engine, 16 jet aircraft and 5 helicopters.

Airlines and destinations:  past & present

United Express (Colgan Air) Saab 340 turboprops flew to Houston (IAH) until July 1, 2012, when the airport lost all scheduled passenger air service. United Express then ran bus service to George Bush Intercontinental Airport.

American Airlines announced their American Eagle affiliate would again serve the airport effective February 14, 2013, with flights to Dallas/Ft. Worth. The American Eagle service is currently operated by Envoy Air Embraer ERJ 135 regional jets with 37 coach seats.

Past airline service

Soon after the Jack Brooks Regional airport was built, BPT was a stop on the Houston-New Orleans route operated by Eastern Airlines; it ended mainline service in 1966. Chicago and Southern Air Lines arrived in 1947, and successor Delta Air Lines continued mainline jet service into Beaumont/Port Arthur until 1979.

Trans-Texas Airways (TTa) and successor Texas International Airlines served the Beaumont/Port Arthur area for over 30 years.  In the fall of 1949 Houston-based TTa flew Douglas DC-3s  six times a day Houston Hobby Airport - Galveston - Beaumont/Port Arthur - Lufkin, TX - Palestine, TX - Dallas Love Field. Eastern Air Lines Convair 440s, Lockheed Constellations and Martin 4-0-4s flew to Houston/Hobby Airport and direct to Baton Rouge and New Orleans. Some Eastern flights continued to Atlanta; Newark, Boston, Corpus Christi and Brownsville.  Delta Air Lines began Convair 440 service in the 1950s flying a Houston Hobby Airport, TX - Beaumont/Port Arthur - Shreveport, LA - Little Rock, AR - Memphis, TN - St. Louis, MO - Chicago Midway Airport, IL routing. Delta inherited the Houston - Chicago route when it merged with Chicago & Southern Airlines, which flew Douglas DC-3s to Beaumont starting in 1947.

Six airlines have flown jets to BPT. Trans-Texas Airways (which subsequently changed its name to Texas International Airlines) flew Douglas DC-9-10 jets as well as Convair 600 turboprops to Houston and Dallas. According to the February 1, 1976 Official Airline Guide (OAG), Texas International was operating direct DC-9 jet service from Los Angeles (LAX) to Beaumont/Port Arthur via five stops en route in Albuquerque, Roswell, Midland/Odessa, Dallas/Fort Worth and Houston. Texas International merged into Continental Airlines which continued jet service from the airport. In 1979, Southwest Airlines was operating four Boeing 737-200 flights a day nonstop to Dallas Love Field. In July 1983, Continental was flying Boeing 727-100s and McDonnell Douglas DC-9-30s nonstop to Houston (IAH). Delta Air Lines flew Boeing 727-200s and McDonnell Douglas DC-9-30s nonstop to Houston (IAH) and Shreveport as well as direct to Atlanta. Delta Connection, operated by Atlantic Southeast Airlines (ASA), flew Canadair CRJ-200s to Atlanta and Embraer EMB-120 Brasilias to Dallas/Ft. Worth, with the latter service ending when Delta closed their DFW hub in early 2005. ExpressJet operating as Continental Express flew Embraer ERJ-145s to Houston (IAH). American Eagle also served the airport with Convair 580s followed by Saab 340s nonstop to Dallas/Ft. Worth (DFW) for American Airlines. USAir Express Beechcraft 1900Cs flew nonstop to New Orleans for USAir.

Commuter airlines serving Beaumont/Port Arthur included Metro Airlines with de Havilland Canada DHC-6 Twin Otters and Short 330s nonstop to Houston (IAH) and Short 330s nonstop to Dallas/Fort Worth (DFW), Royale Airlines Embraer EMB-110 Bandeirantes nonstop to Houston (IAH) and direct to New Orleans, Air Texana with nonstop Beechcrafts to Houston Hobby Airport (HOU) and Dallas Love Field (DAL) and nonstop Douglas DC-3s to New Orleans, and Conquest Airlines Beechcraft 1900Cs and Fairchild Swearingen Metroliners nonstop to Austin and Dallas Love Field. Conquest Airlines was based in the Beaumont/Port Arthur area before moving its headquarters to Austin where it started a hub.

In early 1985, the Jack Brooks Regional airport did not have jet service but was served by four different airlines operating a combined total of 41 flights every weekday into BPT. Most of these flights were nonstops from the Houston area with Metro Airlines operating code sharing service as Eastern Express on behalf of Eastern Airlines with eleven flights every weekday from Houston Intercontinental Airport flown with de Havilland Canada DHC-6 Twin Otter commuter aircraft while Royale Airlines was operating code sharing service as Continental Express on behalf of Continental Airlines with nine flights every weekday operated with Embraer EMB-110 Bandeirante commuter aircraft also from Houston Intercontinental for a total of 20 flights a day from IAH. At this same time, commuter air carrier Texas Airlines was operating seven nonstop flights every weekday from Houston Hobby Airport with small twin prop Piper Aircraft while Metroflight Airlines operating code sharing service as American Eagle on behalf of American Airlines was operating four flights every weekday nonstop from Dallas/Fort Worth International Airport with Convair 580 turboprops which were the largest aircraft serving BPT as this time. By early 1987, Rio Airways was operating "TranStar SkyLink" code sharing service with Beechcraft 1900C commuter propjets on behalf of TranStar Airlines (formerly Muse Air) with ten nonstop flights operated every weekday to Houston Hobby Airport (HOU) where connections were available to TranStar jet service.

Airline and destination

Hurricane Rita
On September 24, 2005, Hurricane Rita hit the Beaumont-Port Arthur area. The then-named Southeast Texas Regional Airport passenger terminal had to be shut down with the airport authority then using the old terminal on a temporary basis. The renovated terminal reopened in May 2009 after several delays.

References

External links

 Jack Brooks Regional Airport, official website
 Southeast Texas Regional Airport, legacy web site
 
 
 

Airports in Texas
Transportation in Jefferson County, Texas
Buildings and structures in Jefferson County, Texas